Gurdwara Damdama Sahib is a gurdwara (Sikh place of worship) located near Humayun's Tomb on the Outer Ring Road in New Delhi, India.

History
This gurdwara is associated with the Tenth Sikh Guru, Guru Gobind Singh. It commemorates his meeting with Prince Muazzam, later Emperor Bahadur Shah, in 1707. The prince had asked him for help in the prince's battle for succession for the throne with his brother, after the death of Aurangzeb. Guru Sahib met the Prince near Humayun's Tomb, and together they drew up their strategy for battle. They watched elephant and bull fights organized for their entertainment. Guru Sahib promised to help the Prince if he would punish all those responsible for the treacherous killing of his sons and destroying his army and his city, Anandpur. Later, Guru Sahib helped the Prince defeat his brother and claim the throne.

Gurdwara Damdama Sahib (place of rest) was first built by Sardar Bhagel Singh in 1783, when a huge Sikh army under his command conquered Delhi. At first it was a small Gurdwara. Later Maharaja Ranjit Singh delegated his officials to renovate the Gurdwara. Consequently, a deorhi (Sikh architectural structure) was constructed, including buildings for priests and pilgrims. In 1984, a new building was constructed. Every year, thousands of devotees assemble here to celebrate the festival called Hola Mohalla.

References

External links 

Gurdwaras in Delhi
18th-century gurdwaras